P'an'gyo County is a kun, or county, in Kangwŏn province, North Korea.  In December 1952, during the Korean War, P'an'gyo was formed as a separate county from five myŏn (Nagyang, Pangjang, P'an'gyo, Ryongp'o, Sannae) of Ichŏn-gun and Yujin-myŏn of P'yŏnggang-gun. Myŏn were administrative units below county (kun) level and are no longer used in North Korea.

Physical features
The land of P'an'gyo is predominantly mountainous, with the Ahobiryŏng Mountains and Masingryŏng Mountains both passing through the county.  The highest point is Tongbaengnyŏnsan.  The county's chief stream is the Rimjin River.  Approximately 88% of the county's area is forestland.

Administrative divisions
P'an'gyo county is divided into 1 ŭp (town) and 22 ri (villages):

Economy

Agriculture
Agriculture is difficult due to the rugged terrain; however, crops are raised here including maize, potatoes, soybeans, wheat, and barley.  Orcharding and livestock farming also play a role.

Mining
Mining is supported by local deposits of copper and nickel.

Transport
P'an'gyo county is served by roads and by several stations on the Ch'ŏngnyŏn Ich'ŏn line of the Korean State Railway.

See also
Geography of North Korea
Administrative divisions of North Korea
Kangwon (North Korea)

External links

Counties of Kangwon Province (North Korea)